Greatest Hits (Ten Years and Change 1979–1991) is a compilation album released in 1991 when Starship ended its recording contract with RCA Records. The album contains two new tracks, "Don't Lose Any Sleep" and "Good Heart". "Good Heart" was released as a single and hit number 81 on the Billboard charts. A third track, "Keys to the City" was recorded at this time and finally saw release on the 2012 compilation Playlist: The Very Best of Starship. "We Built This City" was remixed for this compilation by Bill Bottrel who took out the spoken-word interlude by Les Garland.

Track listing 
{{tracklist
| extra_column = Producer(s)
| title1          = Jane
| note1           = from Freedom at Point Zero
| lyrics1         = David Freiberg, Jim McPherson
| music1          = Freiberg, McPherson, Paul Kantner, Craig Chaquico
| extra1          = Ron Nevison
| length1         = 4:11
| title2          = Find Your Way Back
| note2           = from Modern Times
| lyrics2         = Chaquico
| music2          = Chaquico, Tom Borsdorf
| extra2          = Nevison
| length2         = 4:16
| title3          = Stranger
| note3           = from Modern Times
| lyrics3         = Jeannette Sears
| music3          = Pete Sears
| extra3          = Nevison
| length3         = 4:44
| title4          = No Way Out
| note4           = from Nuclear Furniture
| lyrics4         = Ina Wolf
| music4          = Peter Wolf
| extra4          = Nevison
| length4         = 4:24
| title5          = Layin' It on the Line
| note5           = from Nuclear Furniture
| lyrics5         = Mickey Thomas, Chaquico
| music5          = Chaquico, Thomas
| extra5          = Nevison
| length5         = 4:09
| title6          = Don't Lose Any Sleep
| note6           = 
| lyrics6         = Diane Warren
| music6          = Warren
| extra6          = Nevison
| length6         = 4:22
| title7          = We Built This City
| note7           = Edited Remix, LP Version on Knee Deep in the Hoopla
| lyrics7         = Bernie Taupin, Martin Page, Dennis Lambert, P. Wolf
| music7          = Martin Page
| extra7          = P. Wolf
| length7         = 4:38
| title8          = Sara
| note8           = from Knee Deep in the Hoopla
| lyrics8         = I. Wolf
| music8          = P. Wolf
| extra8          = P. Wolf
| length8         = 4:48
| title9          = Nothing's Gonna Stop Us Now
| note9           = from No Protection
| lyrics9         = Albert Hammond, Warren
| music9          = Hammond, Warren
| extra9          = Narada Michael Walden
| length9         = 4:30
| title10         = It's Not Over ('Til It's Over)
| note10          = from No Protection
| lyrics10        = Robbie Nevil
| music10         = John Van Tongeren, Phil Galdston
| extra10         = Keith Olsen
| length10        = 4:17
| title11         = It's Not Enough
| note11          = from Love Among the Cannibals
| lyrics11        = Page, Tommy Funderburk
| music11         = Page
| extra11         = Mike Shipley, Larry Klein
| length11        = 4:49
| title12         = Good Heart
| note12          = 
| lyrics12        = Page
| music12         = Page
| extra12         = P. Wolf
| length12        = 4:22

}}

Singles / music videos
"Good Heart" (1991) #81 US

Personnel
Previous material from Freedom at Point Zero, Modern Times, Nuclear Furniture, Knee Deep in the Hoopla, No Protection, and Love Among the Cannibals''
Don't Lose Any Sleep
Mickey Thomas – vocals
Craig Chaquico – guitars
Good Heart
Mickey Thomas – lead vocals
Peter Wolf – keyboards, electronics
Martin Page – background vocals
Peter Maunu – guitars

Production
Ron Nevison – producer and engineer on "Don't Lose Any Sleep"
Peter Wolf – producer on "Good Heart"
Paul Erickson – engineer on "Good Heart"
Brian Malouf – mixing engineer on "Good Heart"
"Don't Lose Any Sleep" recorded 1990 at Record Plant, Hollywood, CA and Studio D Recording, Sausalito, CA
"Good Heart" recorded 1991 at Embassy Studios, Simi Valley, CA
Ria Lewerke – art direction
Jacqueline Murphy – design
Stanley Mouse – illustration
Bill Thompson – management
Linda Lalli – assistant to manager

Album cover

References

1991 greatest hits albums
Jefferson Starship albums
Starship (band) albums
RCA Records compilation albums